1972 revolt in Uganda may refer to:
 1972 rebel invasion of northern Uganda
 1972 invasion of Uganda
 1972 Uganda–Tanzanian border conflict